Line of Fire is a first-person light gun shooter game developed by Sega and released for arcades in 1989. It was released with two arcade cabinet versions, a standard upright and a sit-down cockpit, both featuring two positional guns. The cockpit design allows the player(s) to sit down while playing the game, while having two-handed machine guns, controlled by a potentiometer-controlled gun alignment software system. The game follows a two-man commando unit as they try to escape from a terrorist facility after seizing a prototype weapon.

The arcade game was praised by critics for its pseudo-3D graphics and cockpit cabinet, but with the gameplay criticized for being derivative of Operation Wolf (1987) and Operation Thunderbolt (1988). It was converted for home computers and published by U.S. Gold in 1990, and then released for the Master System in 1991; however, the style of the latter was changed to that of an overhead run and gun video game. The home computer versions were criticized for "blocky" visuals, though reviewers found that there were some nice touches, while the Sega Master System version also received mixed reviews.

Gameplay

The game sees the player placed a member of a two-man commando team who have been charged with going behind enemy lines to bring down a terrorist organisation which has access to a large arsenal of weaponry. During the mission the team find a "special weapon", which is a vehicle mounted, automatic machine pistol, and must report their findings. However, the player is faced with many enemy troops and military vehicles which need to be destroyed in order for the commando squad to escape in the jeep, and must use the "special weapon" against the terrorists.

The game is played from a first person perspective, with two cabinet mounted, positional guns used the shoot enemies on the screen. There are eight stages which take place in various settings including the enemy base, jungle, desert and ruins. At the end of each is a boss vehicle which must be destroyed to progress. Ammunition is limited to a few clips of bullets for the machine gun, a small supply of hand grenades and a screen clearing missile, although additional supplies can be obtained by shooting the relevant icon when they appear during play.

The stages scroll both horizontally and into the screen via a pseudo-3D effect, and due to Sega's dedicated sprite handling hardware and software, the game was able to combine the two movements in a single stage, effectively turning corners. This revolutionary system allowed the player to experience a somewhat convincing 3D landscape. Between stages a map screen is displayed which shows the player progressing through the terrorist facility and towards freedom.

Development

The Line of Fire arcade machine uses the Sega X Board hardware, comprising two Motorola 68000 processors running at 12.5Mhz as its CPU, and sound is reproduced using a Yamaha YM2151 sound chip. It features raster graphics at a resolution of 320 x 224 pixels on a horizontally orientated monitor. There are two different arcade cabinets available for the game. One cabinet allows the player(s) to sit down as they are playing the game, reaching forward to use the cabinet mounted light guns. The other is an upright cabinet with attached light guns.

U.S. Gold acquired the licence to release the game on home computers, and versions were produced for the Amiga, Amstrad CPC, Atari ST, Commodore 64 and ZX Spectrum. The conversion for all five home computers was handled by Creative Materials and all were released in 1990. For these versions there is no light gun support: instead the player moves a crosshair using a mouse, joystick or keyboard to target enemies, and pressing a button to fire.

A version was created for the Sega Master System in 1991, published by Sega and developed by Sanritsu Denki. This version is very different from every other conversion as it is an overhead vertically scrolling shooter, although the storyline and locations are mostly unchanged. The game does not feature light gun support, the player using the standard control pad. This game also features support for the SegaScope 3-D Glasses, a way of viewing the game in 3D, if the player enters a button combination when starting up the console with the Line of Fire cartridge inserted.

Reception

Arcade version
In Japan, Game Machine listed Line of Fire on their February 1, 1990 issue as being the third most-successful upright arcade unit of the month. In the United Kingdom, it was one of the top four highest-grossing arcade games during early 1990, along with Teenage Mutant Ninja Turtles, Tecmo World Cup '90 and Super Masters. In North America, Line of Fire was the top-grossing new video game on the RePlay arcade charts in July 1990.

The arcade game was met with a positive-to-mixed reception from critics, with praise for its pseudo-3D graphics and sit-down cabinet but with a mixed response to its derivative gameplay heavily based on Operation Wolf and Operation Thunderbolt. Line of Fire received a positive review from S: The Sega Magazine, calling it an "Utterly fab" game with "Amazing 3D graphics" and "heart-stopping action throughout." RePlay magazine praised the "impressive" graphics and action, stating "the graphics are extremely crisp" and clear, the "explosions look real" and it "achieves a near 3D depth effect" with "realistic backgrounds" that scroll "away" as enemies "come flying in towards you" while stating the gameplay is "a no-holds-barred joyride through explosions and action that just doesn't quit."

Sean Kelly of Zero magazine called it "the best game" at London's 1990 Amusement Trades Exhibition International (ATEI) and stated that, despite being "an Operation Thunderbolt derivative" it "goes about ten steps better." He praised the "fantastic graphics and sonics throughout" the game, "some rather excellent original ideas" and the "brilliant two-handed machine guns" in the sit-down cabinet. Amiga Action called the arcade game "revolutionary" with "addictive two player action" and "a real 3D landscape that your character could run through, shooting both in front and behind" him. Zzap!64 praised the graphics but criticized the gameplay and lack of difficulty. CU Amiga gave it an average review with a 66% score, calling it a poor clone of Operation Wolf, with graphics that "aren't as sharp" and lacking dramatic sound. There was praise for the sit-down cabinet, but the reviewer said this was the only lasting appeal, although they found it a nice touch that defeated enemies stay on the screen rather than disappearing after a few moments, allowing the player to survey the scene they have just created.

Retrospectivaly, Hardcore Gaming 101 praised the graphics, comparing its sprite manipulation to later first-person shooters and textured-mapped 3D polygons, but said the gameplay is "nothing spectacular".

Home conversions
The home conversions received mixed reviews. The Commodore 64 version received a score of 32% in Zzap!64 magazine, with a lack of enemies on screen being a major criticism, although it was said that the attempt at 3D was impressive. The reviewers found the difficulty curve a problem, with level one being too easy and too long, followed by tougher later levels.

The Amiga version was more well received, although it was still not without faults. Tony Horgan said in Amiga User International that a "great job has been done in recreating the graphics of the original"  but found the pace a little slow. He said that this kind of game works better in an arcade as home conversions do not manage to hold the player's attention. The same Zzap!64 review as the Commodore 64 version said that the Amiga version had good presentation with regards to the introduction and map screens between levels, but that the in game graphics were "blocky", and that there were perhaps too many enemies on screen at any one time, in stark contrast to the Commodore 64 version. Amiga Action magazine thought that the Amiga conversion was a "first class conversion from a decent coin-op", and that it really captured the feel of the arcade machine. A minor criticism was that the scoreboard at the top of the screen can obscure enemies from the player's view, leading to damage being inflicted on the player's character. Amiga Format's Trenton Webb praised the Amiga version's speed and said that the graphics "mimic their arcade parent as well as any non-custom circuit set could hope to", although the sprites look rather blocky. Steve Merritt said in CU Amiga that the Amiga version is more playable that the arcade version, but that the last few levels should have been made more difficult. Richard Leadbitter gave both the Amiga and ZX Spectrum versions 85% in his review for Computer and Video Games magazine, praising the pace of the game, especially in the ZX Spectrum version.

The Sega Master System version received mixed reviews. Console XS gave it an 82% score. It was met with some disappointment by the reviewers in Mean Machines, due to it being a very different version to the original arcade game. They said that the Master System had been proved more than capable of running games similar to the original, mentioning Dynamite Duke as an example. They said that it was a poor overhead shooter and although the game has the same locations and general storyline of the original the graphics are too small and badly drawn to be able to tell. They also found the game very easy, it only took one of the reviewers an hour to reach the last level. They thought that people who played the original in the arcade would be the most disappointed of all.

References

1989 video games
Amiga games
Amstrad CPC games
Arcade video games
Atari ST games
Commodore 64 games
Master System games
U.S. Gold games
Video games with stereoscopic 3D graphics
ZX Spectrum games